Integrated Electrical Services, Inc. also known as IES Holdings Incorporated is a roll-up type publicly traded company headquartered in Houston, Texas.  The company provides infrastructure services including electrical, communications, low-voltage, network, AV, and security alarm systems to the residential, industrial and commercial markets.

Integrated Electrical Services has 114 locations with 5,389 employees across the continental United States and was formerly a Fortune 1000 company.

History 
June 26, 1997 incorporates as Integrated Electrical Services Incorporated.

January 27, 1998, Integrated Electrical Services began trading with the symbol (IEE) on the New York Stock Exchange.

In 2002 Integrated Electrical Services was ranked as the largest electrical contractor in the United States, with $ 1.475 billion in revenue.

In February 2006, Integrated Electrical Services filed for chapter 11 bankruptcy and in the same year, three months later, emerged.
  
February 28, 2011 Integrated Electrical Services sold its subsidiary Key Electrical Supply Inc. to Elliott Electric Supply Inc.

In July 2020, Integrated Electrical Services was listed as number five on Houston Chronicle's  "list of the region’s 100 best performing public companies".

Founding companies

Business Units 
Infrastructure Solutions ~ Electro-mechanical 
Communications ~ Technology services to corporations.
Residential ~ Electrical services to multi and single family type housing. 
Industrial & Commercial ~Design, construct and maintain industrial and commercial type of operations.

Acquisitions

References

External links
Integrated Electrical Services
IES Communications 

Companies based in Houston